Krasica is a village in Primorje, Croatia, located northeast of Bakar. The population is 1,353 (census 2011).

References

Populated places in Primorje-Gorski Kotar County